Kasey Carlson (born November 26, 1991) is an American competition swimmer from Walnut Creek, California.

Swimming career
At the 2009 US National Championships and World Championship Trials, Carlson placed second to Rebecca Soni in the 100 m breaststroke with a time of 1:06.54, earning a place to compete at the 2009 World Aquatics Championships in Rome.

At the World Championships, Carlson won the bronze medal in the 100 m breaststroke with a time of 1:05.75.  In the preliminaries of the 50 m breaststroke, Carlson broke the American record with a time of 30.34.  Carlson advanced to the final and placed sixth with a time of 30.65.  Carlson's day-old American record was broken by Soni, who took the silver medal in 30.11.

Personal
Carlson previously swam for Las Lomas High School and the Terrapins Swim Team when she won bronze medal in Rome before she switched to the Walnut Creek Aquabears Swim Team, and was coached by Mike Heaney. Her mother is a former national level swimmer who competed for Florida State.  

Carlson is a graduate of the University of Southern California and her sister, Taylor, swam for the University of California Los Angeles.

Kasey is currently the Social Media Director for the Oakland Raiders.

References

External links
 
 
 
 

1991 births
Living people
American female swimmers
USC Trojans women's swimmers
World Aquatics Championships medalists in swimming